William McKinley (1843–1901) was the president of the United States from 1897 to 1901.

William McKinley may also refer to:

William McKinley (Virginia politician) (fl. 19th century), U.S. Representative from Virginia (1810–1811)
William B. McKinley (1856–1926), U.S. Representative and Senator from Illinois
William B. McKinley (Illinois state legislator) (1879–1964), Speaker of the Illinois House of Representatives
Bill McKinley (1910–1980), American baseball umpire in the American League, 1946–1965
Bill McKinley (footballer) (1882–1952), Australian rules footballer
Bill McKinley (American football)  (born 1949), American football player for the 1971 Buffalo Bills
William Laird McKinlay (1889–1983), author of his own survivor's account of the Last voyage of the Karluk
William Thomas McKinley (1938–2015), American composer and jazz pianist
William McKinley Sr. (1807–1892), American manufacturer, father of President William McKinley

See also
Billy McKinlay (born 1969), Scottish footballer and manager
William McKinlay (fl. 1860s–1870s), South Carolina tailor and state legislator
Jazz Gillum (William McKinley Gillum, 1904–1966), harmonica player